Katie Gutierrez (born Laredo, Texas) is an American novelist.

She graduated from Texas State University. Her work has appeared in Texas Highways, Town & Country. and Time.

Works 

 More Than You'll Ever Know, William Morrow, New York, 2022.

References 

People from Laredo, Texas
21st-century American novelists
Living people
Year of birth missing (living people)
Novelists from Texas
American women novelists
Texas State University alumni